Squatting in the Philippines occurs when people build makeshift houses called "barong-barong"; urban areas such as Metro Manila and Metro Davao have large informal settlements. The Philippine Statistics Authority has defined a squatter, or alternatively "informal dwellers", as "One who settles on the land of another without title or right or without the owner's consent whether in urban or rural areas". Squatting is criminalized by the Urban Development and Housing Act of 1992 (RA 7279), also known as the Lina Law. There have been various attempts to regularize squatter settlements, such as the Zonal Improvement Program and the Community Mortgage Program. In 2018, the Philippine Statistics Authority estimated that out of the country's population of about 106 million, 4.5 million were homeless.

Overview
The Philippine Statistics Authority has defined a squatter as "One who settles on the land of another without title or right or without the owner's consent whether in urban or rural areas". Local media and journalists refer to squatters as "informal settlers."

Out of the country's population of about 106 million, an estimated 4.5 million were homeless according to the Philippine Statistics Authority; of these 3 million were in the capital Manila. Causes of homelessness include poverty and destruction of homes due to natural calamities and climate change.

The growth of homelessness and squatting in urban areas are linked to internal migration from poorer regions. Rural poverty, a major factor in internal migration, has been rooted on various factors, including farmer dispossession and land grabbing, violent suppression of peasant movements, decline of the agricultural sector, and the deterioration of living conditions in rural areas.

History 
Squatters build makeshift houses called "barong-barong" on unused land. The occupations increased after World War II as people moved from rural to urban areas. In Davao City, there was a scramble for land previously owned by Japanese people and these occupations were legalized in the 1950s by the government. By 1968, there were an estimated 75,000 squatters living in informal settlements and inner-city slums.  At the Port of Manila, land was reclaimed in the 1950s in Tondo and quickly occupied by squatters. By 1968, there were over 20,000 households in the informal settlement. Elsewhere in Manila, parks and military land were occupied. The Zone One Tondo Organization (ZOTO) was set up in 1970 to represent squatter interests in Tondo and campaign for land rights. It inspired other groups and the Ugnayan ng Maralitang Tagalunsod (UMT) was founded in 1976 to campaign for squatters on a national scale. The first mass eviction on record in Manila was in 1951 and the largest took place in late 1963 and early 1964 when 90,000 people were displaced. By 1978, there were estimated to be two million squatters in Manila, occupying 415 different locations.

President Ferdinand Marcos announced martial law in December 1972 and by 1975 he had introduced a decree criminalizing squatting in an attempt to stop the expansion of informal settlements. The dictatorship often forcibly relocated squatters to sites 30 or 40 km outside cities. First Lady Imelda Marcos wanted to beautify Manila and therefore evicted thousands of squatters when the city hosted the 1974 Miss Universe Pageant and the 1976 meeting of the IMF and World Bank. She commented in 1982 that "professional squatters [were] plain land-grabbers taking advantage of the compassionate society". The government attempted to resettle the squatters elsewhere, only for the squatters to return to their homes which were near where they worked, so the Zonal Improvement Program (ZIP) was started in the late 1970s. Slums were then upgraded in situ: The occupations were regularized and supplied with sanitation and electricity. There were squatters at the U.S. Naval Base Subic Bay and the Clark Air Base in the 1980s. In this time, the government began to forcibly resettle squatters again, moving them to places such as Bagong Silang in Caloocan and Payatas in Quezon City. Resistance to evictions fed into the opposition to the Marcos dictatorship and resulted in the 1986 People Power Revolution.

The Community Mortgage Program was set up in 1992, aiming to help low-income families transition from squatting to affordable housing. By 2001, around 106,000 families had found secure housing in over 800 separate communities. In 1993, slums in Metro Manila were estimated to contain 2.39 million people, or 30.5 per cent of the area's total population and 706,185 people had been assisted by the ZIP. Impoverished squatters lived on landfill sites such as Smokey Mountain and Payatas dumpsite, working as scavengers.

On January 12, 2000, informal settlers living along Circumferential Road 4 (C-4 Road) in Malabon City were forcibly removed from the area by local policemen, who were conducting a clearing operation to make way for the Camanava Mega-Flood Control project, and squatters who refused to cooperate were temporarily sent to the Malabon police station via dump trucks. Up to 93 squatters and policemen sustained injuries from the operation.
The Kalipunan ng Damayang Mahihirap (Kadamay, or Federation of Mutual Aid for the Poor) carried out the Pandi housing project occupation in March 2017. The occupation of over 5,000 housing units built by the National Housing Authority (NHA) in Bulacan was at first condemned by President Rodrigo Duterte and then regularized. The group then attempted to squat NHA property in Rodriguez, Rizal the following year and in 2019 it picketed the NHA offices in Quezon City.

Legal
The Urban Development and Housing Act of 1992 (RA 7279), also known as the Lina Law after its proponent Joey Lina, criminalized squatting yet discouraged evictions except in certain cases, such as when the occupation was carried out by "professional squatters and squatting syndicates". The Marcos decree which had previously outlawed squatting was annulled by the Anti-Squatting Law Repeal Act of 1997 (RA 8368).

The Presidential Commission for the Urban Poor, created on December 8, 1986, through Executive Order No. 82, is tasked to formulate policy and implement programs for the urban poor.

The Community Mortgage Program, set up following the People Power Revolution (EDSA I) of 1988, aims to help low-income families who are squatting  find secure tenure by establishing community associations to buy land, set up infrastructure, and build houses.

In 2021, the Philippine House of Representatives declared a housing emergency in the country through  House Resolution 1677. The resolution called on the Department of Human Settlements and Urban Development and other government agencies to address the housing gap by providing housing to the homeless population and to families living in informal settlements. The department estimated the government's housing backlog at 6.5 million units in 2022.

See also
Land reform in the Philippines
Street children in the Philippines
Poverty in the Philippines

References

Squatting in the Philippines
History of the Philippines (1986–present)
History of the Philippines (1946–1965)
History of the Philippines (1965–1986)
Housing in the Philippines
Poverty in the Philippines